U-38 may refer to one of the following German submarines:

 , was a Type U 31 submarine launched in 1914 and that served in the First World War until surrendered on 23 February 1919
 During the First World War, Germany also had these submarines with similar names:
 , a Type UB II submarine launched in 1916 and sunk on 8 February 1918; in 2008 UB-38s wreck was moved to reduce the danger to shipping
 , a Type UC II submarine launched in 1916 and sunk 14 December 1917
 , a Type IX submarine that served in the Second World War until scuttled on 5 May 1945

Submarines of Germany